The cecum or caecum is a pouch within the peritoneum that is considered to be the beginning of the large intestine. It is typically located on the right side of the body (the same side of the body as the appendix, to which it is joined). The word cecum (plural ceca ) stems from the Latin caecus meaning blind.

It receives chyme from the ileum, and connects to the ascending colon of the large intestine. It is separated from the ileum by the ileocecal valve (ICV) or Bauhin's valve. It is also separated from the colon by the cecocolic junction. While the cecum is usually intraperitoneal, the ascending colon is retroperitoneal.

In herbivores, the cecum stores food material where bacteria are able to break down the cellulose. In humans, the cecum is involved in absorption of salts and electrolytes and lubricates the solid waste that passes into the large intestine.

Structure

Development
The cecum and appendix are derived from the bud of cecum that forms during week 6 in the midgut next to the apex of the umbilical herniation. Specifically, the cecum and appendix are formed by the enlargement of the postarterial segment of the midgut loop.  The proximal part of the bud grows rapidly to form the cecum. The lateral wall of the cecum grows much more rapidly than the medial wall, with the result that the point of attachment of the appendix comes to lie on the medial side. The cecum's position changes after the midgut rotates and the ascending colon elongates, and the accumulation of meconium inside the cecum may result in the latter's increased diameter.

History

Etymology
The term cecum comes from Latin (intestinum) caecum, literally 'blind intestine', in the sense 'blind gut' or 'cul de sac'. It is a direct translation from Ancient Greek τυφλὸν (ἔντερον) typhlòn (énteron). Thus the inflammation of the cecum is called typhlitis.

In dissections by the Greek philosophers, the connection between the ileum of the small intestine and the cecum was not fully understood. Most of the studies of the digestive tract were done on animals and the results were compared to human structures.

The junction between the small intestine and the colon, called the ileocecal valve, is so small in some animals that it was not considered to be a connection between the small and large intestines. During a dissection, the colon could be traced from the rectum, to the sigmoid colon, through the descending, transverse, and ascending sections. The cecum is an end point for the colon with a dead-end portion terminating with the appendix.

The connection between the end of the small intestine (ileum) and the start (as viewed from the perspective of food being processed) of the colon (cecum) is now clearly understood, and is called the ileocolic orifice. The connection between the end of the cecum and the beginning of the ascending colon is called the cecocolic orifice.

Clinical significance
A cecal carcinoid tumor is a carcinoid tumor of the cecum. An appendiceal carcinoid tumor (a carcinoid tumor of the appendix) is sometimes found next to a cecal carcinoid.

Neutropenic enterocolitis (typhlitis) is the condition of inflammation of the cecum, primarily caused by bacterial infections.

Over 99% of the bacteria in the gut are anaerobes, but in the cecum, aerobic bacteria reach high densities.

Other animals

A cecum is present in most amniote species, and also in lungfish, but not in any living species of amphibian. In reptiles, it is usually a single median structure, arising from the dorsal side of the large intestine. Birds typically have two paired ceca, as do, unlike other mammals, hyraxes. Parrots do not have ceca.

Most mammalian herbivores have a relatively large cecum, hosting a large number of bacteria, which aid in the enzymatic breakdown of plant matter such as cellulose; in many species, it is considerably wider than the colon. In contrast, obligate carnivores, whose diets contain little or no plant matter, have a reduced cecum, which is often partially or wholly replaced by the appendix. Mammalian species which do not develop a cecum include raccoons, bears, and the red panda.

Many fish have a number of small outpockets, called pyloric ceca, along their intestine; despite the name they are not homologous with the cecum of amniotes, and their purpose is to increase the overall area of the digestive epithelium. Some invertebrates, such as squid, may also have structures with the same name, but these have no relationship with those of vertebrates.

Gallery

See also
 McBurney's point

References

External links

 —"Abdominal organs in situ."
 —"The larger intestine."
 —"The cecum with the distal portion of the ileum."
 —"Incisions of the Cecum"
 
 Photo at mgccc.cc.ms.us
 Video clip of worms in the Cecum

Digestive system
Latin words and phrases